As You Wish is the seventh extended play by South Korean-Chinese girl group WJSN. It was released on November 19, 2019, by Starship Entertainment and distributed by Kakao M. It contains a total of seven songs, including the lead single "As You Wish".

Background and release 
On October 24, 2019, WJSN revealed through its official social media accounts that the group would release a new mini-album.

Commercial performance 
As You Wish sold 49,410 copies in its first week of release according to Hanteo. It debuted at number 2 on the weekly Gaon Album Chart. The album went on to sell over 63,000 copies in the month of November 2019, thus in just 11 days, ranking 8th on the monthly Gaon Album Chart. As of April 2020, the album has sold 96,647 copies in South Korea.

The album's title track, "As You Wish" was charted at number 106 on the Gaon Digital Chart on the week ending November 23, 2019.

On January 1, 2020, at 1AM KST, the title track shot up on the charts as voted by the public to be the first song to be heard in the New Year. The song reached number 4 on MelOn and topped its 5-minute realtime chart. It also reached number 4 on Genie, number 1 on Bugs, and number 2 on FLO.

On January 1, 2021, at 1AM KST, "As You Wish" reached number one on MelOn, Bugs and Genie real-time chart. This signifies the 2nd year "As You Wish" was chosen as Korea's New Year Song.

On January 1, 2022, at 1AM KST, "As You Wish" once again reached number one on MelOn, Bugs, and Genie real-time charts. This is the third time the song was chosen to be Korea's New Year Song.

On January 1, 2023, at 1AM KST, "As You Wish" once again reached number one on MelOn, Bugs, and Genie real-time charts. This is the fourth time the song was chosen to be Korea's New Year Song.

Track listing

Awards and nominations

Music program wins

Charts 
Weekly charts

Monthly charts

Year-end charts

Release history

References 

Korean-language EPs
Starship Entertainment EPs
Cosmic Girls EPs
2019 EPs